Ludolph may refer to:

 Ludolph of Ratzeburg (d. 1250), Bishop of Ratzeburg and saint
 Ludolph of Saxony (14th century), German ecclesiastical writer
 Ludolph van Ceulen (1540-1610), German mathematician
 Ludolph Berkemeier (1864-1930), Dutch landscape and cityscape painter
 Ludolph Christian Treviranus (1779–1864), German botanist
 Ludolph Hendrik van Oyen (1889–1953), Chief of Staff of the Royal Netherlands East Indies Army during World War II, one of the principal commanders of Indonesian National Revolution

See also

 Ludolf
 Rudolph (disambiguation)

Given names